Robert “Bob” Whitehead was a U.S. soccer player who spent time with St. Louis Kutis S.C.  He also earned two caps with the U.S. national team in 1957.

Club career
Whitehead played with St. Louis Kutis S.C. during the mid-1950s when they were a dominant U.S. team.  Kutis won the 1957 Amateur Cup and National Challenge Cup.  Whitehead was inducted into the St. Louis Soccer Hall of Fame in 1984.

National team
After Kutis won the 1957 National Cup, the US Football Association decided to call up the entire team to represent the U.S. in two World Cup qualification games.  As a result, Whitehead earned two caps with the U.S. national team, both losses to Canada.  The first was a 5-1 loss on June 22, 1957.  The second game was a July 6 loss to Canada.

References

American soccer players
United States men's international soccer players
Soccer players from St. Louis
St. Louis Kutis players
Living people
Association footballers not categorized by position
Year of birth missing (living people)